Eschatology: Death and Eternal Life is a book written by Joseph Cardinal Ratzinger (later Pope Benedict XVI), originally published in German in 1977 and subsequently translated into English in 1988. The book is the study of the "eschaton", the end times in accordance with the Christian doctrine, such as the parousia, heaven, and hell. Among the issues addressed in it is the concept of purgatory, which he argues may be existential—not temporal—in duration.

References

1977 non-fiction books
1988 non-fiction books
Christian eschatology
Books by Pope Benedict XVI
Books published by university presses